The Bronze Retirement Medallion is awarded by the Central Intelligence Agency for a career of at least 15, but less than 25, years with the Agency.

See also 
Awards and decorations of the United States government

References

Retirement medallions of the Central Intelligence Agency